Jordan Hicks (born June 27, 1992) is an American football middle linebacker for the Minnesota Vikings of the National Football League (NFL). He played college football at Texas.

High school career
Hicks attended Lakota West High School in West Chester, Ohio, where he started his final three seasons for their football team, posting 216 tackles, 8.5 sacks, 36 tackles for loss, three forced fumbles, four interceptions, 10 pass breakups, and a touchdown. He was an All-American selection by Parade, USA Today, and EA Sports. Hicks won the High School Dick Butkus Award in 2009.

College career
Hicks played college football at Texas from 2010 to 2014 under head coach Mack Brown. He started the first three games of his junior season at weakside linebacker, but then missed the remainder of the season due to a hip injury. He earned a medical redshirt to preserve a year of eligibility, and the following season, started the first four games at weakside linebacker before again suffering a season-ending injury, this time a ruptured left Achilles tendon. He returned from the injury to start all 13 games in the 2014 season.

College statistics

Professional career
On December 1, 2014, it was announced that Hicks had accepted his invitation to play in the 2015 Senior Bowl. On January 24, 2015, Hicks played in the Reese's Senior Bowl and recorded five combined tackles to help Tennessee Titans' head coach Ken Whisenhunt's North team defeat the South 34–13. He was one of 34 collegiate linebackers to attend the NFL Scouting Combine in Indianapolis, Indiana. Hicks completed all of the combine drills and ran the 11th fastest 40-yard dash among all linebackers. He also finished with the third best vertical jump and broad jump among his position group. On March 24, 2015, Hicks attended Texas' pro day, along with Malcom Brown, Quandre Diggs, Jaxon Shipley, Geoff Swaim, Cedric Reed, Mykkele Thompson, and ten other prospects. He opted to stand on his combine numbers and only perform positional drills for NFL team representatives and scouts from all 32 NFL teams attended, including New England Patriots' defensive coordinator Matt Patricia. At the conclusion of the pre-draft process, Hicks was projected to be a fourth or fifth round pick by NFL draft experts and scouts. He was ranked the fourth best outside linebacker in the draft by NFL analyst Charles Davis and the ninth best outside linebacker prospect by NFLDraftScout.com.

Philadelphia Eagles
The Philadelphia Eagles  selected Hicks in the third round (84th overall) of the 2015 NFL Draft. He was the ninth linebacker selected in 2015.

2015
On May 14, 2015, the Philadelphia Eagles signed Hicks to a four-year, $2.99 million contract that includes a signing bonus of $652,732.

Throughout his first training camp, he competed against Mychal Kendricks, Kiko Alonso, Demeco Ryans, and Najee Goode for a starting inside linebacker job in defensive coordinator Billy Davis' base 3-4 defense. Head coach Chip Kelly named him the backup inside linebacker behind starters Kendricks and Ryans to starts the regular season.

He made his professional regular season debut in the Philadelphia Eagles' season-opening 26–24 loss at the Atlanta Falcons. The following week, Hicks made seven solo tackles, his first career sack, and forced a fumble during a 20–10 loss to the Dallas Cowboys. He made his first career tackle on Jason Witten after he caught a five-yard pass by quarterback Tony Romo in the second quarter, He also had the first sack and forced fumble of his career after he sacked Romo for an eight-yard loss in the third quarter and Fletcher Cox made the fumble recovery. While making the sack, Hicks broke Romo's collarbone. He earned more snaps on defense after linebackers Mychal Kendricks suffered a hamstring injury and Kiko Alonso injured his knee in first half of the game. On September 27, 2015, Hicks earned his first career start due to injuries to Kendricks and Alonso. He recorded a season-high ten combined tackles, deflected a pass, recovered a fumble, and made his first career interception off a pass attempt by Ryan Fitzpatrick during the Eagles' 24–17 victory at the New York Jets.

In Week 6, Hicks made his third career start in place of Mychal Kendricks and collected a season-high ten solo tackles in a 27–7 victory over the New York Giants. On November 8, 2015, he made seven combined tackles, deflected a pass, an interception, and scored his first career touchdown during a 33–27 overtime victory at the Dallas Cowboys. He scored his first career touchdown after intercepting quarterback Matt Cassel and returning it 67 yards in the fourth quarter. Unfortunately, he left the game in the fourth quarter after suffering an apparent pectoral injury. On November 9, 2015, the Philadelphia Eagles placed Hicks on injured reserve after it was discovered he suffered a torn pectoral. At the time of the injury, Hicks led the team in tackles. Hicks finished his rookie season with 50 combined tackles (43 solo), three pass deflections, two interceptions, a sack, and a touchdown in eight games and five starts. The Philadelphia Eagles finished the season 7–9, and head coach Chip Kelly was fired after Week 16.

2016
Hicks entered training camp slated as the starting middle linebacker, but saw competition from veteran Stephen Tulloch. The Philadelphia Eagles opted to change to a base 4-3 defense and had Hicks take over middle linebacker after DeMeco Ryans retired. Head coach Doug Pederson named Hicks the starting middle linebacker to begin the regular season.

Hicks started the Philadelphia Eagles' season-opener against the Cleveland Browns and recorded four solo tackles and deflected a pass in their 29–10 victory. On October 23, 2016, he collected a season-high 11 combined tackles, defended two passes, and sacked Minnesota Vikings' quarterback Sam Bradford in the Eagles' 21–10 victory. The following week, Hicks made six combined tackles, deflected a pass, and made his first interception of the season on a pass attempt by Cowboys' quarterback Dak Prescott during a 29–23 loss. In Week 9, he collected seven combined tackles, two pass deflections, and intercepted Giants' quarterback Eli Manning to set up a potential game-winning touchdown in their 28–23 loss. On January 1, 2017, Hicks made five solo tackles, deflected two passes, and had his first multi-interception game after picking off Mark Sanchez two times during a 27–13 win over the Cowboys. He finished the season with 85 combined tackles (58 solo), 11 pass deflections, five interceptions, and one sack in 16 games and 16 starts.

2017

Hicks entered his second season under defensive coordinator Jim Schwartz as the returning starting middle linebacker after his stellar season in 2016.

He started the Philadelphia Eagles' season-opener  against the Washington Redskins and recorded seven combined tackles and recovered a fumble from quarterback Kirk Cousins during a 30–17 victory. On October 1, 2017, he collected a season-high seven combined tackles during the Eagles' 26–24 win at the Los Angeles Chargers. During a Week 7 matchup against the Redskins, Hicks suffered a season-ending achilles injury and was placed on injured reserve on October 31, 2017. Without Hicks, the Eagles won 13 games and reached Super Bowl LII where they defeated the New England Patriots 41–33.

2018
Hicks made his return from injury in week 1 against the Atlanta Falcons.  In the game, Hicks recorded a team high 7 tackles and sacked Matt Ryan 1.5 times during the 18–12 win.
In week 2 against the Tampa Bay Buccaneers, Hicks recorded a team high 9 tackles and recovered a fumble forced by teammate Malcolm Jenkins on wide receiver Mike Evans and returned it 13 yards during the 27–21 loss.
In week 8 against the Jacksonville Jaguars, Hicks recorded a season-high 13 tackles and sacked Blake Bortles 1.5 times during the 24–18 win.
In week 11 against the New Orleans Saints, Hicks recorded 7 tackles before straining his calf in the fourth quarter of the 48–7 loss.
Hicks made his return from the calf strain in week 16 against the Houston Texans.  In the game, Hicks recorded 5 tackles during the 32–30 win.
Hicks finished the season with 91 tackles (61 solo), three sacks, one fumble recovery, and five pass deflections in 12 games started.

Hicks made his playoff debut in the Wild Card Round against the Chicago Bears.  In the game, Hicks recorded 3 tackles in the 16–15 win which became known as Double Doink.
In the Divisional Round of the playoffs against the New Orleans Saints, Hicks recorded 9 tackles during the 20–14 loss.

Arizona Cardinals

2019
On March 15, 2019, Hicks signed with the Arizona Cardinals on a four-year, $36 million contract, with $20 million guaranteed and a $12 million signing bonus.
Hicks made his debut with the Cardinals in week 1 of the season against the Detroit Lions.  In the game, Hicks recorded a season-high 14 tackles during the 27–27 tie game.
In week 7 against the New York Giants, Hicks recorded his first interception of the season off a pass thrown by Daniel Jones in the 27–21 win.
In week 10 against the Tampa Bay Buccaneers, Hicks recorded a team high 9 tackles and intercepted a pass thrown by Jameis Winston during the 30–27 loss.
In week 11 against the San Francisco 49ers, Hicks recorded 12 tackles, his first sack of the season on Jimmy Garoppolo, and intercepted a pass thrown by Garoppolo during the 36–26 loss.
In week 16 against the Seattle Seahawks, Hicks recorded 6 tackles and recovered a fumble forced by teammate Chandler Jones on wide receiver David Moore during the 27–13 win.
Hicks finished the season with 150 tackles (93 solo), 1.5 sacks, two forced fumbles, one fumble recovery, six pass deflections, and three interceptions in 16 games started.

2020

In Week 17 of the 2020 season against the Los Angeles Rams, Hicks recorded his first and only interception of the season off a pass thrown by John Wolford during the 18–7 loss.

2021
In Week 13, Hicks had 13 tackles, two sacks and two tackles for loss in a 33–22 win over the Chicago Bears, earning NFC Defensive Player of the Week. He started all 17 games, leading the defense in snaps, finishing second on the team with 116 tackles, four sacks, five passes defensed, and a forced fumble.

On March 9, 2022, Hicks was released by the Cardinals.

Minnesota Vikings
On March 15, 2022, Hicks signed a two-year contract with the Minnesota Vikings.

On March 13, 2023, Hicks agreed to a restructured contract with the Minnesota Vikings.

NFL career statistics

Personal life
Hicks is married to Ivana Hicks. They have three children.

References

External links
 Sports-Reference (college)
Texas Longhorns bio
Arizona Cardinals bio

1992 births
Living people
Players of American football from Colorado Springs, Colorado
American football linebackers
Texas Longhorns football players
Philadelphia Eagles players
Arizona Cardinals players
Minnesota Vikings players